Richard D. Crandall, known as Rich Crandall (born 1967), is a businessman, former Arizona legislator, and former director of the Wyoming Department of Education.

Background

Crandall was born in Santa Barbara, California. He holds a bachelor's and master's degree in accounting from Brigham Young University and an MBA from the University of Notre Dame in South Bend, Indiana. He is a Certified Public Accountant.

Career

Arizona lawmaker
Crandall is a moderate Republican a former member of the Arizona State Senate and Arizona House of Representatives. Elected in 2007 to the House and 2010 to the Senate, he resigned in 2013 to accept a position in Wyoming.

Wyoming Department of Education
Crandall was director of the Wyoming Department of Education, based in the capital city of Cheyenne, Wyoming from August 2013 to April 2014. The position of Director was dissolved when the Wyoming Supreme Court, in a three-to-two vote on 28 January 2014, ruled the legislation that created the position unconstitutional. The court ruled that the law removing the duties of the superintendent of public instruction and placing them into the hands of an appointed director conflicts with the Wyoming State Constitution. The court ruled Crandall's director position as unconstitutional.

Education Commissioner of Colorado
He was appointed the Education Commissioner of Colorado in December 2015. 
Crandall resigned his position as Colorado's Commissioner of Education on May 19, 2016, a mere four months into the job.

Current
Crandall is the founder and chair of CN Resource and is also the CFO/partner for Crandall Corporate Dietitians. He currently serves on the board of directors of digital marketing firm ChannelNet.

Personal
He is member of the Church of Jesus Christ of Latter-Day Saints and is married to Leann Larson Crandall and together they have 13 children (seven from his first marriage to Patrice Webb and six from his second marriage).

Notes

References

Sources
Crandall's legislative bio

1967 births
Living people
Wyoming Republicans
Latter Day Saints from California
Brigham Young University alumni
University of Notre Dame alumni
Republican Party Arizona state senators
Politicians from Cheyenne, Wyoming
Politicians from Mesa, Arizona
Businesspeople from Arizona
Latter Day Saints from Indiana
Latter Day Saints from Arizona
Latter Day Saints from Wyoming
Latter Day Saints from Colorado